Jerusalem is an unincorporated community and census-designated place (CDP) in Conway County, Arkansas, United States. It was first listed as a CDP in the 2020 census with a population of 137. Jerusalem has a post office with ZIP code 72080.

Name 

Jerusalem is named for Jerusalem, which is considered a holy city to Muslims, Jews, and Christians.

Education 
Public education for elementary and secondary school students is provided by the Wonderview School District, which leads students to graduate from Wonderview High School. Although Jerusalem is located in the Wonderview School District, some students go to either Hector or Clinton for education.

Demographics

2020 census

Note: the US Census treats Hispanic/Latino as an ethnic category. This table excludes Latinos from the racial categories and assigns them to a separate category. Hispanics/Latinos can be of any race.

References

Unincorporated communities in Conway County, Arkansas
Unincorporated communities in Arkansas
Census-designated places in Arkansas
Census-designated places in Conway County, Arkansas